Trimethobenzamide (trade names Tebamide, Tigan) is an antiemetic used to prevent nausea and vomiting.

Mechanism of action 
Trimethobenzamide is an antagonist of the D2 receptor. It is believed to affect the chemoreceptor trigger zone (CTZ) of the medulla oblongata to suppress nausea and vomiting.

Side effects 

Possible side effects include drowsiness, dizziness, headache, muscle cramps, and blurred vision. More serious adverse effects include skin rash, tremors, parkinsonism, and jaundice.

Formulations 

Trimethobenzamide is marketed under the brand names Tebamide and Tigan, manufactured by GlaxoSmithKline and King Pharmaceuticals, respectively. It is available as oral capsules and injectable formulations.

Trimethobenzamide was also available as a rectal suppository, but such formulations were banned by the U.S. Food and Drug Administration on April 6, 2007, due to unproven efficacy.

Synthesis

Alkylation of the sodium salt of p-hydroxybenzaldehyde (1) with 2-dimethylaminoethyl chloride affords the ether (2). Reductive amination of the aldehyde in the presence of ammonia gives diamine (3). Acylation of that product with 3,4,5-trimethoxybenzoyl chloride affords trimethobenzamide (4).

See also 
 Domperidone
 Metoclopramide

References

External links 
 Tebamide
 Tigan (manufacturer's website)

Antiemetics
Benzamides
D2 antagonists
Phenol ethers